Daniel Ward may refer to:

Daniel Ward (boxer) (born 1963), South African boxer of the 1980s, 1990s and 2000s
Daniel Ward (footballer) (born 1977), former Australian rules footballer with Melbourne Football Club
Daniel P. Ward (1918–1995), American jurist
Danny Ward (rugby league) (born 1980), English rugby league coach and former rugby league footballer
Danny Ward (English footballer) (born 1990), English football forward and winger
Danny Ward (Welsh footballer) (born 1993), Welsh football goalkeeper

See also
Dan Ward-Smith (born 1978), rugby player
Daniel W. Connolly, American politician